Football is the most popular sport in Hungary. The Hungarian Football Federation is the highest body of professional football in Hungary and was founded in 1901. The Hungary national team has played in numerous international tournaments, including the inaugural football tournament in the Olympic Games (Stockholm 1912), nine World Cups, and two European Championships. Their greatest achievements are the three gold medals in the 1952, 1964 and 1968 Olympic Games, and the runner-up in the 1938 and 1954 World Cups. The team known as the Mighty Magyars was also the first non-British team to defeat England, 6–3 at Wembley in 1953. Months later, they defeated the English by a convincing 7–1 in Budapest in 1954, the worst defeat in the history of the English team.

History
The first ever football club to be founded in Hungary was Budapesti Torna Club having founded its football section in February of 1897, dissolved in 1945-46. BTC is soon followed by the founding of the football sections of other important sport clubs in the city: the Magyar Úszó Egylet (MUE), the Budai Football Csapat, the Müegyetemi FC (MFC, later MAFC), the Magyar Athletikai Club (MAC)  and the Budapesti Budai Torna Egylet (BBTC). Most of the associations were already operational in other sports and set up their football divisions after the popularisation that came with the first local an international games played by BTC and its followers. The first match between clubs to be played came on the 6th of February 1898 when BTC played against Müegyetemi FC, with the later winning 5-0 despite BTC having trained the MFC players previously. Nowadays the oldest still active football clubs in Hungary are Műegyetemi FC founded on the 1st of November of 1897 as a purely football club and III. Kerületi TVE, whose football section was officially opened in 1899 but stemmed from the Budai Football Csapat founded on the 31st of October 1897.

The Hungarian Football Federation ( or MLSZ), the sport's national governing body, was founded on the 19th of January of 1901 by 13 clubs: BAK, BEAC, BSC, Budapesti TC, Budai Ganzgyár, Ganz Vagongyár, "33" FC, MAC, Magyar FC, Magyar ÚE, Műegyetemi FC, Postás, FTC, who took part in the first championship in 2 tiers that same year. The philosoph Jász Géza of Magyar FC, was nominated the first president of the MLSZ. Vice-presidents were nominated Ferenc Gillemot (MAFC) and Árpád Füzeséry (MUE), secretary general Ferenc Horváth (FTC), treasurer Gabona Károly (Budapesti TC), inspector Ignác Boros (BSC), accountants Róbert Békés (Ganz), Andor Telkes and Ferenc Eisner, and honorary president Károly Iszer (BTC).

Hungary were regular features at major tournaments, such as the first Olympic Football Tournament (Stockholm 1912) and many FIFA World Cup. They were the first non-UK team to beat England at Wembley Stadium with their 6-3 victory in 1953. The golden age of Hungarian football took place in the 1950s, with the emergence of players of the caliber of Ferenc Puskás, László Kubala, Zoltán Czibor, Sándor Kocsis, Nándor Hidegkuti, Ferenc Szusza, József Bozsik & Gyula Grosics.  This team (with the exception of Kubala, who only played 3 games with Hungary before playing for Spain) was known as the Golden Team and remained undefeated for 32 consecutive games, winning the gold medal in the 1952 Olympic Games in Helsinki and reaching the final in the 1954 World Cup in Switzerland, always with Ferenc Puskás as a star (84 goals in 85 matches playing for the Hungary national football team). The twilight of this team that marveled the world came with the Hungarian Revolution of 1956, and after a match of the European Champion's Cup Budapest Honvéd in Bilbao, many of the stars like Czibor, Kocsis and Puskás decided not to return to their country and sign for teams from Western Europe, meaning his retirement from the national team. Puskás joined Real Madrid in 1958, winning three European Cups and debuting with the Spain national football team in 1961, while Czibor and Kocsis joined FC Barcelona. In 1967, the Ferencváros T.C. Flórián Albert became the inaugural Hungarian to win the Golden Ball, surpassing the second place achieved by Puskás seven years before.

Domestic football

Hungary's capital Budapest has seven professional football teams, six of them have won the Hungarian 1st division. Until July 2012 teams based in Budapest have won the Hungarian Championship 96 times and teams from other cities have won it 14 times.

The Hungarian football clubs have several international successes. Ferencvárosi TC won the 1964–65 edition of the Inter-Cities Fairs Cup and was runner-up in the European Cup Winners' Cup in 1974–75 season  and the Cup of Fairs in 1968, while Újpest FC reached the final of the Fair Cup in 1969, Videoton FC UEFA Cup in 1985, and the MTK Budapest to that of the Recopa in 1964.

Domestic tournaments
 Hungarian National Championship I
 Hungarian National Championship II
 Hungarian Cup
 Hungarian Super Cup

Clubs
The table below lists all Budapest clubs in the top three tiers of the Hungarian football league system: from the top division (the Nemzeti Bajnokság I), down to the Nemzeti Bajnokság III. League status is correct for the 2012–13 season.

Administration

Budapest is the location of the headquarters of the Hungarian Football Federation.

National team

The Hungarian national team, in its different categories, is controlled by the Hungarian Football Federation.

The Hungarian team played their first official game on 12 October 1902 in Vienna against Austria, a match that was resolved with a 5–0 win for the Austrians. Hungary has played in nine FIFA World Cups and two European Championships. The best result of Hungary national team was when they reached the FIFA World Cup final twice; they lost to Italy in 1938, and lost again to West Germany in 1954. Since then, Hungary's performance has diminished.

Hungary football stadiums

References

 

lt:Vengrijos futbolo sistema